National Lampoon's Bag Boy is a 2007 American comedy film directed by Mort Nathan, starring Dennis Farina, Paul Campbell and Marika Dominczyk. The plot involves a teenager who enters the competitive world of grocery store bagging.

Cast
 Dennis Farina as Marty Engstrom
 Paul Campbell as Phil Piedmonstein
 Marika Domińczyk as Bambi Strasinsky
 Josh Dean as Freddy
 Robert Hoffman as Clyde 'Windmill' Wynorski
 Nick Lashaway as Ace
 Wesley Jonathan as Alonzo Ford
 Bruce Altman as Norman
 Lisa Darr as Laurie
 Larry Miller as Pike
 Richard Kind as Dave Weiner
 Rob Moran as Ralph Riley
 Jeanette Puhich as Beehive Hair Woman
 Erin Hiatt as Scantily Clad Girl
 Carlos Lacamara as Julio
 Carly Craig as The girl in the museum
 Michael O'Connell as Cart Wrangler
 Brooke Shields as Mrs. Hart

References

External links
 
 

Bag Boy
2007 comedy films
2007 films
2000s English-language films